Arthur Valentine Cleaver OBE FRAeS (14 February 1917 – 16 September 1977) was a distinguished British rocket engineer. He co-authored a paper which discussed the possibilities and problems of nuclear rocket engines in 1948. After the Second World War he developed de Havilland's Sprite and Spectre rocket engines. He moved to Rolls-Royce in 1957 and in 1960 he became general manager and chief engineer of the Rolls-Royce's rocket departments, where he was responsible for the engines which powered the Blue Streak missile and Black Arrow launch vehicle. While the ELDO vehicle was ultimately unsuccessful and abandoned, the Blue Streak vehicle and its engines worked perfectly on every launch, and Cleaver was awarded the OBE for his part in developing them.

Early life
He was born at Conway in Wales to Percy and Mildred Cleaver. From the age of 11 he became fascinated by space. For three years from 1931 he attended Acton Technical College. He joined the British Interplanetary Society (BIS) in 1937, aged 20.

Career

de Havilland
In 1935, aged 18, he joined the Propeller Division of de Havilland, where he later became Chief Project Engineer of the de Havilland Propeller Company. He moved back to de Havilland where Frank Halford was Technical Director of their engine company. He was commissioned by Frank Halford to conduct a study into rocket engines, and their (unknown) capabilities. He began his studies in April 1946 forming a rocket team at de Havilland Engine Company.

In the 1950s he oversaw the development of the Sprite and Spectre rocket engines, developed for rocket assisted take off and mixed power plant installations for military aircraft. During this period he became friends with Maurice Brennan, the Chief Designer at Saunders-Roe, who designed the SR.53 mixed power interceptor; this was the first rocket-powered British aircraft.

Rolls-Royce
In 1956 he handed in his notice at de Havilland and became Chief Rocket Propulsion Engineer of Rolls-Royce's new rocket engine division. Under his guidance the RZ.2 rocket engine was developed, an advanced engine for its time. For the work on this engine he was awarded the OBE.

He worked with Rocketdyne.

Personal life
In 1955 he argued that photographs taken from space of the Earth would transform people's psychological outlook. In 1957 at the International Congress of Astronautics he said that, in aviation, predictions ran behind actual events.

Val was best friends with the science fiction writer Arthur C. Clarke and their correspondence was voluminous. It is available in the Arthur C. Clarke Collection of Sri Lanka housed at the Smithsonian's National Air and Space Museum.

He died aged 60. His funeral was held on 6 October 1977 in Enfield.

References

Citations

External links
 British Interplanetary Society

1917 births
1977 deaths
British aerospace engineers
Fellows of the Royal Aeronautical Society
People from Conwy
Rocket scientists
Rolls-Royce people
Space advocates
Space programme of the United Kingdom